William Houston Bates (born December 20, 1991) is an American football outside linebacker who is currently a free agent. He played college football at the University of Illinois and Louisiana Tech University as a defensive end. He signed with the Washington Redskins as an undrafted free agent in 2015.

Professional career
After a try-out, Bates signed with the Washington Redskins on May 18, 2015. Despite having a considerably strong preseason performance, he was waived on September 5 for final roster cuts before the start of the regular season. He signed to the team's practice squad the next day. On September 12, the Redskins promoted Bates to the active roster, but was waived on September 14. He re-signed with the team's practice squad on September 16. He was promoted again to the active roster on November 7 after Jackson Jeffcoat was placed on the team's injured reserve.

On December 20, 2016, Bates was placed on the team's injured reserve after tearing his ACL the day before during a game against the Carolina Panthers. He was waived following a failed physical on July 27, 2017.

References

External links
Louisiana Tech Bulldogs bio
Washington Redskins bio

1991 births
Living people
American football defensive ends
American football outside linebackers
Washington Redskins players
Louisiana Tech Bulldogs football players